Salome De Barthez De Marmorieres (born 20 July 1997) is a French Polynesian triathlete who has represented French Polynesia at the Pacific Games.

De Barthez De Marmorieres was born in Papeete in Tahiti and has been practicing triathlon since the age of eleven. She studied engineering and management at the École centrale de Nantes and Audencia Business School.

At the 2015 Pacific Games in Port Moresby she won silver in the triathlon. At the 2019 Pacific Games in Apia she won gold in the aquathon and silver in the triathlon.

References

Living people
1997 births
People from Papeete
French Polynesian triathletes